Events in the year 1999 in Gabon.

Incumbents 

 President: Omar Bongo Ondimba
 Prime Minister: Paulin Obame-Nguema (until 23 January), Jean-François Ntoutoume Emane (from 23 January)

Events 

 Gabon of the Future was founded by Sylvestre Oyouomi.

Deaths

References 

 
1990s in Gabon
Years of the 20th century in Gabon
Gabon